The Jansen House is a historic house in Atchison, Kansas. It was built in 1900 for John M. Price, a politician. It was acquired by Helen Jansen in 1903, and it remained in the same family until 1927. It belonged to the  Linville-Leacy family from 1928 to 1983.

The house was designed in the Queen Anne architectural style. It has been listed on the National Register of Historic Places since December 6, 2005.

References

Houses on the National Register of Historic Places in Kansas
National Register of Historic Places in Atchison County, Kansas
Queen Anne architecture in Kansas
Houses completed in 1900